Morforex (INN; Bo 637), also referable to as N-morpholinoethylamphetamine, is an anorectic which was never marketed.

It produces amphetamine as an active metabolite.

Synthesis

Amphetamine is reacted with N-Chloroethylmorpholine [3240-94-6] in the presence of IPA solvent.

See also
 Fenethylline
 Phenmetrazine

References

Substituted amphetamines
Anorectics
4-Morpholinyl compunds
Norepinephrine-dopamine releasing agents